The Wofford Terriers men's basketball team represents Wofford College in Spartanburg, South Carolina, United States, in Division I of the NCAA. The school's team competes in the Southern Conference. Wofford is coached by Jay McAuley, who was promoted after long-time head coach Mike Young left for Virginia Tech after the 2018–19 season. Wofford plays its home games at Jerry Richardson Indoor Stadium, opened for the 2017–18 season as the replacement for Benjamin Johnson Arena.

The Terriers have been playing Division I basketball in the Southern Conference since the 1997–98 season. They have won 4 regular season SoCon Titles and 5 SoCon Tournament Championships and are one-time SoCon Tournament Runner-Ups. The Terriers currently hold a 1-5 record in the NCAA Tournament. Wofford has defeated various high major opponents during their 27 years in NCAA Division 1. They have beaten North Carolina twice, South Carolina twice, Georgia twice, Clemson, Georgia Tech, NC State, Seton Hall, Purdue, Tulane, Wake Forest, Cincinnati, Auburn, Virginia Tech, Air Force, George Mason, and Xavier since joining D1 for the 1995-96 season.

On March 8, 2010 the Wofford Terriers men's basketball team defeated Appalachian State to win the Southern Conference tournament, marking the first time Wofford qualified to compete in the NCAA tournament. Although Wofford came within a possession of upsetting 4th seeded Wisconsin in the first round, they eventually lost 49–53. The Terriers qualified for the NCAA tournament for the second time on March 7, 2011, winning the Southern Conference tournament over College of Charleston, 77-67, but they lost in the first round to BYU. Brad Loesing, point guard and 4.0 Phi Beta Kappa student, was selected first team Division 1 Academic All-American. In 2013, Wofford won the Southern Conference tournament and qualified for the NCAA tournament for the third time in five years, losing to Michigan in the second round. Wofford also won a spot in the 2015 NCAA tourney, going 28-6. In February 2016, Wofford set an NCAA record when it hit 17 of 21 shots from the three-point line against VMI. For the 2017 season, a new state-of-the-art basketball and volleyball arena, Jerry Richardson Indoor Stadium, opened on the Wofford campus. In the 2017 season, Wofford defeated the defending national champion North Carolina Tar Heels in Chapel Hill, the first Wofford win against a ranked opponent & the first win against a Top 5 opponent in school history.

During the 2018-19 season, Wofford was nationally ranked for the first time in school history. The Terriers finished with a 30-5 record and 18-0 in the Southern Conference, the first undefeated SoCon season in the modern era. As a 7-seed in the NCAA Tournament, they defeated 10th seeded Seton Hall 84-68 in the first round, and during the game Wofford star Shooting Guard Fletcher Magee broke the NCAA record for All-Time Career Three Pointers made. They went on to lose to Kentucky 62-56 in the second round of the NCAA tournament in a contest that garnered the second highest ratings of any game during the Round of 32. Fletcher went on to win the 2019 Lou Henson Award, an award given annually by CollegeInsider.com to the most outstanding mid-major men's college basketball player in NCAA Division I competition. They spent the final 5 weeks in the AP Top 25 poll, finishing in the Final AP Top 25 at #19. Following the season, legendary Wofford basketball coach Mike Young was hired as the new Head Coach at Virginia Tech, with Jay McAuley taking over as Wofford Head Coach.

During the 2019-2020 season, Wofford beat the 17th ranked North Carolina Tar Heels again in Chapel Hill for the second time in 3 years. They finished 7th in the Southern Conference during the regular season, but made a run in the Southern Conference Tourney, with its second appearance in the SoCon title game in as many years, losing to ETSU in the final. The following season, 2020–21, the season was significantly shortened due to COVID-19 and no fans were allowed to attend games. Wofford finished Second in the SoCon during the regular season, a half game back of UNC-G. This sparked controversy as Wofford held a head-to-head advantage with UNC-G, and Wofford was not allowed to make-up a game with Samford which had been delayed and later cancelled. As a two seed in the SoCon Tournament, Wofford was upset by 7th seed Mercer, losing 62-61.

NCAA Division I history
After two years as a Division I independent, Wofford joined the Southern Conference for the 1997–98 season.

  After initially accepting a bid to play in the 2022 The Basketball Classic, Wofford ultimately withdrew, ahead of their game against Youngstown State.

Postseason

NCAA Division I Tournament results
The Terriers have appeared in the NCAA Division I tournament five times. Their combined record is 1–5.

CBI results
The Terriers have appeared in the College Basketball Invitational (CBI) one time. Their record is 0–1.

CIT results
The Terriers have appeared in the CollegeInsider.com Postseason Tournament (CIT) one time. Their record is 0–1.

National honors

Lou Henson Award - National Mid-Major Player of the Year

Fletcher Magee (2018–19)

Sporting News - National Coach of the Year

Coach Mike Young (2018–19)

AP All-America Team

Noah Dahlman (2009–10) 

Fletcher Magee (2017–18) 

Fletcher Magee (2018–19)

National Association of Basketball Coaches - All-District First Team

Storm Murphy (2020–21)

Cameron Jackson (2018–19)

Fletcher Magee (2018–19)

Fletcher Magee (2017–18)

Eric Garcia (2016–17)	

Spencer Collins (2015–16)

Karl Cochran (2014–15)

Karl Cochran (2013–14)

Brad Loesing (2011–12)

Noah Dahlman (2010–11)

Noah Dahlman (2009–10)

National Association of Basketball Coaches - All-District Second Team

Nathan Hoover (2019–20)

Lee Skinner	(2014–15)

Lee Skinner (2013–14)

Karl Cochran (2012–13)

Kevin Giltner (2011–12)

Noah Dahlman (2008–09)

Junior Salters (2008–09)

US Basketball Writers Association - Player of the Week

Fletcher Magee (March 3, 2019)

Charleston Classic - All Tournament Team

Jamar Diggs (2010–11)

Chicago Invitational - All Tournament Team

Brad Loesing (2011–12)

Academic honors
Academic All-America Team

Brad Loesing 2011–12 (1st Team)

Academic All-District Team

Brad Loesing 2011–12 (1st Team)

Brad Loesing 2010–11 (1st Team)

Greg O'Dell 1991–92

Harold Jackson 1981–82

Southern Conference honors

Southern Conference Player of the Year
SoCon media first presented a player of the year award at the end of the 1951–52 season. The league's coaches began awarding their own version in 1989–90.
 Noah Dahlman: 2009–10 (coaches)
 Karl Cochran: 2014–15 (both)
 Fletcher Magee: 2017–18 (media), 2018–19 (both)

Southern Conference Defensive Player of the Year
 Brad Loesing: 2011–12

Southern Conference Freshman of the Year
SoCon media first presented a freshman of the year award at the end of the 1978–79 season. The league's coaches began awarding their own version in 1992–93.
 Ian Chadwick: 1997–98 (both)
 Karl Cochran: 2011–12 (both)
 Fletcher Magee: 2015–16 (both)

Southern Conference Coach of the Year
SoCon media have presented a coach of the year award since the 1946–47 season. The league's coaches began awarding their own version in 1988–89.
 Mike Young: 2009–10 (both), 2013–14 (media), 2014–15 (both), 2018–19 (both)

All–Southern Conference Team (Coaches)

Storm Murphy 2020–21 (1st Team)

Nathan Hoover 2019–20 (2nd Team)

Fletcher Magee 2018–19 (1st Team)

Cameron Jackson 2018–19 (1st Team)

Fletcher Magee 2017–18 (1st Team)

Cameron Jackson 2017–18 (2nd Team)

Fletcher Magee 2016–17 (1st Team)

Eric Garcia 2016–17 (1st Team)

Spencer Collins 2015–16

Karl Cochran 2014–15

Lee Skinner 2014–15

Karl Cochran 2013–14

Brad Loesing 2011–12

Kevin Giltner 2011–12

Noah Dahlman 2010–11

Noah Dahlman 2009–10

Tim Johnson 2009–10

Noah Dahlman 2008–09

Drew Gibson 2007–08

Howard Wilkerson 2005–06

Mike Lenzly 2002–03

Ian Chadwick 2000–01

Ian Chadwick 1999–00

Ian Chadwick 1998–99

All–Southern Conference Team (Media)

Storm Murphy 2020–21 (1st Team)

Nathan Hoover 2019–20 (3rd Team)

Fletcher Magee 2018–19 (1st Team)

Cameron Jackson 2018–19 (1st Team)

Fletcher Magee 2017–18 (1st Team)

Cameron Jackson 2017–18 (2nd Team)

Fletcher Magee 2016–17 (1st Team)

Eric Garcia 2016–17 (1st Team)

Spencer Collins 2015–16 (1st Team)

Karl Cochran 2014–15 (1st Team)

Lee Skinner 2014–15 (2nd Team)

Spencer Collins 2014–15 (3rd Team)

Karl Cochran 2013–14 (1st Team)

Lee Skinner 2013–14 (3rd Team)

Karl Cochran 2012–13 (2nd Team)

Brad Loesing 2011–12 (1st Team)

Kevin Giltner 2011–12 (2nd Team)

Noah Dahlman 2010–11 (1st Team)

Tim Johnson 2010–11 (3rd Team)

Cameron Rundles 2010–11 (3rd Team)

Noah Dahlman 2009–10 (1st Team)

Tim Johnson 2009–10 (3rd Team)

Jamar Diggs 2009–10 (3rd Team)

Noah Dahlman 2008–09 (1st Team)

Junior Salters 2008–09 (3rd Team)

Drew Gibson 2007–08 (3rd Team)

Shane Nichols 2005–06 (3rd Team)

Howard Wilkerson 2005–06 (2nd Team)

Tyler Berg 2004–05 (2nd Team)

Howard Wilkerson 2003–04 (3rd Team)

Lee Nixon 2002–03 (3rd Team)

Mike Lenzly 2002–03 (2nd Team)

Mike Lenzly 2001–02 (3rd Team)

Mike Lenzly 2000–01 (3rd Team)

Ian Chadwick 2000–01 (1st Team)

Ian Chadwick 1999–00 (1st Team)

Ian Chadwick 1998–99 (1st Team)

All–Southern Conference Freshman Team

Max Klesmit 2020–21

Morgan Safford 2020–21

Sam Godwin 2020–21

Messiah Jones 2019–20

Storm Murphy 2017–18

Nathan Hoover 2016–17

Fletcher Magee 2015–16

Eric Garcia 2013–14

Spencer Collins 2012–13

Karl Cochran 2011–12

Brad Loesing 2008–09

Junior Salters 2006–07

Tyler Berg 2002–03

Justin Stephens 2001–02

Ian Chadwick 1997–98

Southern Conference All–Tournament Team

Storm Murphy 2020–21 (2nd Team)

Chevez Goodwin 2019–20 (1st Team)

Storm Murphy 2019–20 (2nd Team)

Fletcher Magee 2018–19 (1st Team)

Nathan Hoover 2018–19 (1st Team)

Cameron Jackson 2018–19 (1st Team)

Fletcher Magee 2017–18 (1st Team)

Nathan Hoover 2017–18 (2nd Team)

Cameron Jackson 2018–19 (2nd Team)

Fletcher Magee 2015–16 (2nd Team)

Fletcher Magee 2015–16 (2nd Team)

Lee Skinner 2014–15 (1st Team)

Karl Cochran 2014–15 (1st Team)

Spencer Collins 2014–15 (1st Team)

Karl Cochran 2013–14 (1st Team)

Lee Skinner 2013–14 (1st Team)

Eric Garcia 2013–14 (2nd Team)

Noah Dahlman 2010–11 (1st Team)

Jamar Diggs 2010–11 (1st Team)

Cameron Rundles 2010–11 (1st Team)

Noah Dahlman 2009–10 (1st Team)

Jamar Diggs 2009–10 (1st Team)

Tim Johnson 2009–10 (2nd Team)

Cameron Rundles 2009–10 (2nd Team)

Southern Conference tournament Most Outstanding Player

 Noah Dahlman: 2010, 2011
 Karl Cochran: 2014
 Lee Skinner: 2015
 Fletcher Magee: 2019

Individual season records

Individual career records

Individual single game records

References

External links